"If You Keep Throwing Dirt" is a song by Canadian country music group Family Brown. The song was released as a single in 1976. It reached number one on the RPM Country Tracks chart in Canada in October 1976.

Chart performance

References

1976 singles
Family Brown songs
RCA Records singles